The vice president of India is the deputy to the head of state of the Republic of India, i.e. the president of India. The office of vice president is the second-highest constitutional office after the president and ranks second in the order of precedence and first in the line of succession to the presidency. The vice president is also the ex officio chairman of the Rajya Sabha.

Article 66 of the Constitution of India states the manner of election of the vice president. The vice president is elected indirectly by members of an electoral college consisting of the members of both Houses of Parliament and not the members of state legislative assembly by the system of proportional representation using single transferable votes and the voting is conducted by Election Commission of India via secret ballot. The vice president also acts as the chancellor of the central universities of India.

Jagdeep Dhankhar of the Bharatiya Janata Party is the current vice president. He became vice president after defeating Indian National Congress candidate Margaret Alva in the 2022 Indian vice presidential election.

Election, oath and term

Qualifications 
As in the case of the president, to be qualified to be elected as vice president, a person must:
 Be a citizen of India.
 Be at least 35 years of age.
 Not hold any office of profit.

Unlike in the case of the president, where a person member of the Lok Sabha, the vice president must be qualified for election as a member of the Rajya Sabha. This difference is because the vice president is to act as the ex officio chairman of the Rajya Sabha. At a time the vice president acts in either of two capacities (i.e. chairman of the Rajya Sabha or president of India); he cannot act in both offices simultaneously.

Election 
The vice president is elected indirectly, by an electoral college consisting of members (elected as well as nominated) of both Houses of Parliament (Lok Sabha & Rajya Sabha) , by the system of proportional representation using single transferable votes and the voting is by secret ballot. The election of the vice president is slightly different from the election of the president as the members of state legislatures are not part of the electoral college but the nominated members of Rajya Sabha are part of it.

The nomination of a candidate for election to the office of the vice president must be subscribed by at least 20 electors as proposers and 20 electors as seconders.

The Election Commission of India, which is a constitutional autonomous body, conducts the election. The election is to be held no later than 60 days of the expiry of the term of office of the outgoing vice president. A returning officer is appointed for the election, usually the secretary-general of either House of Parliament, by rotation. The returning officer issues a public notice of the intended election, inviting nomination of candidates. Any person qualified to be elected and intending to stand for election is required to be nominated by at least twenty members of Parliament as proposers, and at least twenty other members of Parliament as seconders. The nomination papers are scrutinized by the returning officer, and the names of all eligible candidates are added to the ballot.

The election is held via proportional representation using single transferable votes by secret ballot. Voters stack-rank the candidates, assigning 1 to their first preference, 2 to their second preference, and so on. The number of votes required by a candidate to secure the election is calculated by dividing the total number of valid cast votes by two and adding one to the quotient by disregarding any remainder. If no candidate obtains the required number of first-preference votes, the candidate with the fewest first-preference votes is eliminated and his or her second-preference votes are transferred. The process is repeated until a candidate obtains the requisite number of votes. Nominated members can also participate in the election.

After the election has been held and the votes counted, the returning officer declares the result of the election to the electoral college. Thereafter, the returning officer reports the result to the Government of India (Ministry of Law and Justice) and the Election Commission of India, and the government publishes the name of the person elected as vice president, in the Official Gazette.

The vice president may resign office by submitting a letter of resignation to the president. The resignation becomes effective from the day it is accepted.

If the Vice president resigns then the vacant post has to be filled as soon as possible whereas in the case of President, election has to be held within 6 months.

Election disputes 
All disputes arising in connection with the election of the vice president are petitioned to the Supreme Court of India, which inquires into the matter. The petition is heard by a five-member bench of the Supreme Court, which decides on the matter. The decision of the Supreme Court is final.

The Supreme Court inquires into and decides upon all doubts and disputes arising out of or in connection with the election of the vice president per Article 71(1) of the constitution. The Supreme Court can remove the vice president for committing electoral malpractices or upon being ineligible to be a Rajya Sabha member under the Representation of the People Act, 1951. Subject to Article 71 (3), Parliament has made applicable rules or procedure to petition the Supreme Court for resolving the disputes that arise only during the election process of the vice president but not the doubts that arise from his unconstitutional actions or deeds or changing citizenship during his tenure which may violate the requisite election qualifications. The Supreme Court shall also expeditiously decide any doubt raised by which the elected vice president could be ineligible to be a Rajya Sabha member for the unconstitutional acts committed before becoming vice president. Under Article 71(1), it is the responsibility of the Supreme Court to inquire and decide about the so-called unconstitutional acts committed by the vice president such as turning down the notice of the Rajya Sabha members to impeach the chief justice of India and other judges of Supreme Court and High Courts per Article 124(4) and Judges (Inquiry) Act, 1968 or allowing a bill passed under simple majority instead of procedure applicable to constitutional amendment or falsely declaring a bill passed.

Oath or affirmation 
Article 69 of the Constitution of India provides for the oath or affirmation for the office of vice president as follows:-
"I, A.B., do swear in the name of God /solemnly affirm that I will bear true faith and allegiance to the Constitution of India as by law established and that I will discharge the duty upon which I am about to enter."The president administers the oath of office and secrecy to the vice president.

Term 
The vice president holds office for five years. The vice president can be re-elected any number of times. However, the office may be terminated earlier by death, resignation, or removal. The Constitution does not provide a mechanism of succession to the office of vice president in the event of an extraordinary vacancy, apart from re-election. However, the deputy chairman of the Rajya Sabha can perform the vice president's duties as the chairman of the Rajya Sabha in such an event.

However, when the president dies in office and vice president takes over as president, the vice president can continue serving as the president for a maximum of 6 months within which a new president shall be elected.

Removal 
The Constitution states that the vice president can be removed by a resolution of the Rajya Sabha passed by an effective majority (majority of all the then members) and agreed by the Lok Sabha with a simple majority (Article 67(b)). But no such resolution may be moved unless at least 14 days notice in advance has been given. Notably, the Constitution does not list grounds for removal. No vice president has ever faced removal or the chairman in the Rajya Sabha cannot be challenged in any court of law per Article 122

The Supreme Court can also remove the vice president for committing electoral malpractices and not fulfilling the eligibility criteria for Rajya Sabha while in the office per Article 71(1) of the constitution. Per Article 71(1), the Supreme Court also must examine the doubts raised in connection with the conduct of a vice president and remove the vice president if found committing contempt of the Constitution.

Salary and pension 
There is no provision for the salary of the vice president of India in that capacity. In addition, the vice president is entitled to a daily allowance, free furnished residence, medical, travel, and other facilities. The constitution provides that when the vice president acts as the president or discharges the duties of the president, the vice president is entitled to the salary and privileges of the president. The pension for the vice president is 50% of the salary. In fact, he is the only official who does not get any salary and emoluments of his designated post (i.e. vice president).

List of vice presidents of India

See also 
Prime Minister of India
Spouse of the vice president of India
Deputy Chairperson of the Rajya Sabha
Speaker of the Lok Sabha
Deputy Speaker of the Lok Sabha
Leader of the House in Rajya Sabha
Leader of the Opposition in Rajya Sabha
Leader of the House in Lok Sabha
Leader of the Opposition in Lok Sabha
Secretary General of the Rajya Sabha

References

External links 
 

 
India